A magnifier is a device used for magnification.

Magnifier can also refer to:
Magnifying glass, an optical device for magnification
Screen magnifier, software that magnifies part of a computer screen
Magnifier (Windows), a screen magnifier included with Microsoft Windows
Magnifying transmitter, alternate version of a Tesla Coil
Red dot magnifier, a magnified optic used on firearms

See also
Video magnifier, an electronic device used for optical magnification